Liptovské Sliače (until 2001 Sliače) is a village and municipality in Ružomberok District in the Žilina Region of northern Slovakia.

History
In historical records the village was first mentioned in 1263.

Geography
The municipality lies at an altitude of 550 metres and covers an area of 19.596 km². It has a population of about 3811 people.

References

External links
https://web.archive.org/web/20080111223415/http://www.statistics.sk/mosmis/eng/run.html

Villages and municipalities in Ružomberok District